Carlos Costa may refer to:

 Carlos Costa (banker) (born 1949), governor of the Portuguese central bank
 Carlos Costa (footballer) (born 1966), Portuguese football player and coach
 Carlos Costa (pilot) (1966–1996), American private pilot
 Carlos Costa (tennis) (born 1968), Spanish former tennis player
 Carlos Costa (swimmer) (born 1973), Canadian swimmer in the Canadian Disability Hall of Fame
 Carlos Azpiroz Costa (born 1956), Argentine Dominican friar, Archbishop of Bahia Costa

See also 
 Carlos Acosta (born 1973), Cuban-born British ballet dancer
 Carlos Acosta (sport shooter) (born 1908), Mexican Olympic shooter